A regional election took place in Rhône-Alpes on March 15, 1998, along with all other regions.

In a controversial election, Charles Millon (UDF) was originally elected after accepting the votes of 35 FN councillors. However, his election was voided by the Constitutional Council, and Anne-Marie Comparini (UDF) won a new vote in January 1999 against a  candidate.

1998 elections in France
1988